Aemona lena, the white dryad, is a butterfly found in Asia that belongs to the Morphinae subfamily of the brush-footed butterflies family.

Distribution
In South East Asia the white dryad ranges from Myanmar (Karen Hills, the Shan Hills and around Maymyo) to  Yunnan (south west China).

Status
In 1932, William Harry Evans wrote that the subspecies Aemona lena haynei, Tytler is not rare in the Shan States. The nominate subspecies, Aemona lena lena, Atkinson is rare in the Karen Hills.

See also
List of butterflies of India (Morphinae)
List of butterflies of India (Nymphalidae)

Cited references

References
 
 

Amathusiini
Butterflies of Indochina
Butterflies described in 1872
Taxa named by William Stephen Atkinson